Samar Khan is a Pakistani cyclist. She is the first woman in the world to ride cycle on 4,500 meters Biafo Glacier in the Karakoram Mountains of Gilgit Baltistan.

Early life and education 
Khan belongs to Khas Dir, Khyber Pakhtunkhwa. She holds a master's degree in physics from Federal Urdu University. She discovered her love for sports in Army School of Physical Training, Kakul, from where she learned Para-gliding.

Achievements 
In July 2016, Khan became the first woman in the world to cycle atop 4,500-metre-high Biafo Glacier in the Karakoram Mountains of Gilgit-Baltistan. She reached Pak-China border, Khunjerab from Islamabad on cycle & rode over 4693  meters in -5 °C to set a national record. The Biafo Glacier is the world's third longest glacier outside the polar regions.
 A certified paraglider from Army School of Physical Training, Kakul.
 National record of riding 1000 km, at the height of 4693m to Khunjerab (Pak-China Border).
 Registered in Pakistan Book of Records.
 Founder of 'Pace for Peace', Two Girls Ride.
 Motivational speaker in 'TEDx' Islamabad, 2016.
 Awarded in 'Travel2Pakistan day' by 'Pk Travels' for promoting tourism.
In order to highlight the threat of Climate Change she signed up as a Goodwill Ambassador for World Wildlife Fund (WWF) in September 2019  
In December 2017, Khan reached the summit of Africa's highest peak, and she became the first Pakistani woman to summit Africa's highest peak, Mount Kilimanjaro.
Samar has been selected in ‘Global Sports Mentoring Program’ by US Department of State because of her sports achievements and promotion of tourism in Pakistan.   
She represented Pakistan in US, while building her action plan called, ‘Samar Camp’  to launch biking events and training sessions nationwide. She got mentored by one of the biggest snowboarding company in US, ‘’Burton Snowboards’’(Vermont).

References 

Pakistani female cyclists
Living people
1990 births